Jakušovce is a village and municipality in Stropkov District in the Prešov Region of north-eastern Slovakia.

History
In historical records the village was first mentioned in 1454.

Geography
The municipality lies at an altitude of 291 metres and covers an area of 5.502 km². It has a population of about 53 people.

References

External links
 
 
https://web.archive.org/web/20071027094149/http://www.statistics.sk/mosmis/eng/run.html

Villages and municipalities in Stropkov District
Zemplín (region)